Musica is a festival of contemporary classical music held annually in Strasbourg since 1983. The specialization in modern music is encouraged by government patronage.

References

External links
About the festival (French) 

Music festivals established in 1983
Classical music festivals in France
Festivals in Strasbourg